The Third Aguirre Government was the regional government of the Community of Madrid from June 2011 until September 2012, led by Esperanza Aguirre, who took possession as President of the Community of Madrid on 16 June 2011. Her ministers assumed office on 17 June.

Historia 
Voted by the plenary of the Assembly of Madrid as President of the Community of Madrid on 15 June 2011, Esperanza Aguirre assumed office for the third time in a row on 16 June. The individuals she chose as members of her cabinet assumed office in the Royal House of the Post Office a day later, on 17 June.

On 25 January 2012, Pablo Cavero (who came from the private sector and who was not then a member of the People's Party), assumed office as minister of Transports and Infraestructures on 25 January 2012, replacing Antonio Beteta, who had been in office until December 2011 (Regina Plañiol had been acting minister meanwhile).

After the announcement of the resignation of Esperanza Aguirre on 17 September 2012 as regional president, her right-hand Ignacio González became the acting president, presiding over the first council of government on 20 September. He was formally invested as president by the regional legislature on 26 September, with the subsequent inauguration taking place a day later (his ministers assumed office on 28 September).

Notes

References 

2011 establishments in the Community of Madrid
2012 disestablishments in the Community of Madrid
Cabinets established in 2011
Cabinets disestablished in 2012
Cabinets of the Community of Madrid